The 2014 Gosport Borough Council election took place on 22 May 2014 to elect members of Gosport Borough Council in England. This was on the same day as other local elections. UKIP gained its first representation on the council, with the Labour, the Liberal Democrats, and UKIP each gaining a seat from the Conservatives; whilst they had a reduced majority, the Conservatives remained in administration.

Election Result

Ward Results

Alverstoke

Anglesey

Bridgemary North

Bridgemary South

Brockhurst

Christchurch

Elson

Forton

Grange

Hardway

Lee East

Lee West

Leesland

Peel Common

Privett

Rowner and Holbrook

Town

References

2014 English local elections
2014
2010s in Hampshire